This is a list of flag bearers who have represented Afghanistan at the Olympics.

Flag bearers carry the national flag of their country at the opening ceremony of the Olympic Games.

See also
Afghanistan at the Olympics

References

Afghanistan at the Olympics
Afghanistan
Olympic